Another Side may refer to:

Another Side (Corbin Bleu album), 2007 album
Another Side (Fingers Inc. album), 1988 album
Another Side (John Barrowman album), 2007 album
Another Side of Bob Dylan, 1964 Bob Dylan album
Another Side of Genesis, 2004 Daryl Stuermer album
Another Side of Singles II, 2002 Luna Sea compilation album
Another Side of This Life: The Lost Recordings of Gram Parsons, 2004 Gram Parsons compilation album